A leap year starting on Saturday is any year with 366 days (i.e. it includes 29 February) that begins on Saturday, 1 January, and ends on Sunday, 31 December. Its dominical letters hence are BA. The most recent year of such kind was 2000 and the next one will be 2028 in the Gregorian calendar or, likewise 2012 and 2040 in the obsolescent Julian calendar. In the Gregorian calendar, years divisible by 400 are always leap years starting on Saturday.  The most recent such occurrence was 2000 and the next one will be 2400, see below for more.

Any leap year that starts on Tuesday, Friday or Saturday has only one Friday the 13th: the only one in this leap year occurs in October. Common years starting on Sunday share this characteristic, but also have another in January. From August of the common year preceding that year until October in this type of year is also the longest period (14 months) that occurs without a Friday the 13th. Common years starting on Tuesday share this characteristic, from July of the year that precedes it to September in that type of year.

In this leap year, Martin Luther King Jr. Day is on January 17, Valentine's Day is on a Monday, Presidents Day is on its latest possible date, February 21, the leap day is on a Tuesday, Saint Patrick's Day is on a Friday, Memorial Day is on May 29, Juneteenth is on a Monday, U.S. Independence Day is on a Tuesday, Labor Day is on September 4, Thanksgiving is on November 23, and Christmas is on a Monday.

This is the only type of year in which all dates (except 29 February) fall on their respective weekdays the minimal 56 times in the 400 year Gregorian Calendar cycle. Additionally, these types of years are the only ones which contain 54 different calendar weeks (2 partial, 52 in full) in areas of the world where Sunday is considered the first day of the week, and also the only type of year to contain 53 full weekends.

Calendars

Applicable years

Gregorian Calendar 
Leap years that begin on Saturday, along with those that start on Monday or Thursday, occur least frequently: 13 out of 97 (≈ 13.402%) total leap years in a 400-year cycle of the Gregorian calendar. Their overall occurrence is thus 3.25% (13 out of 400).

400 year cycle

century 1:  028, 056, 084

century 2:  124, 152, 180

century 3:  220, 248, 276

century 4:  316, 344, 372, 400

Julian Calendar 
Like all leap year types, the one starting with 1 January on a Saturday occurs exactly once in a 28-year cycle in the Julian calendar, i.e. in 3.57% of years. As the Julian calendar repeats after 28 years that means it will also repeat after 700 years, i.e. 25 cycles. The year's position in the cycle is given by the formula ((year + 8) mod 28) + 1).

References

Gregorian calendar
Julian calendar
Saturday